Tony Drazan is an American film director and screenwriter. He grew up in Rockville Centre, New York.

He is perhaps best known for writing and directing the 1992 film Zebrahead, his film writing and directing debut.  Zebrahead was produced by Chuck Mitchell.

His other film directing credits include Imaginary Crimes starring Harvey Keitel and Hurlyburly starring Sean Penn. He also directed episodes of the television series Trinity and The West Wing. His last directing credit was the 2003 television pilot E.D.N.Y.

From 2011 to 2014, Drazan performed on stage in scripted one-man shows including The Leak, The Nod  Off-Broadway.

References

External links

1955 births
American film directors
American male screenwriters
American television directors
Living people
English-language film directors
Place of birth missing (living people)